Ankhnesneferibre was an ancient Egyptian princess and priestess during the 26th Dynasty, daughter of pharaoh Psamtik II and his queen Takhuit. She held the positions of Divine Adoratrice of Amun and later God's Wife of Amun between 595 and 525 BC, during the reigns of Psamtik II, Apries, Amasis II and Psamtik III, until the Achaemenid conquest of Egypt.

Biography
In 595 BC, Ankhnesneferibre was dispatched to Thebes to be adopted by the God's Wife of Amun Nitocris I, as a stela from Karnak records. Ankhnesneferibre held the position of Divine Adoratrice until Nitocris' death in pharaoh Apries' regnal Year 4 (586 BC), after which she became the new God's Wife. She governed at Thebes for several decades until 525 BC, when the Persian emperor Cambyses II defeated Psamtik III and conquered Egypt, putting an end to the 26th Dynasty and the positions of Divine Adoratrice of Amun and God's Wife of Amun. After this date, Ankhnesneferibre disappeared from history as the last God's Wife, as did her likely successor, the Divine Adoratrice Nitocris II. As with many of her predecessors, Ankhnesneferibre's tomb is located within the temple of Medinet Habu.

For Ankhnesneferibre several attestations are known, above all a statue depicting her now exhibited at the Nubian Museum of Aswan (CG 42205), and her black basalt sarcophagus, which was subsequently reused in Deir el-Medina during the Ptolemaic period by a man named Pymentu, and which is today located in the British Museum.

Ancestry

References

Further reading

External links
 The stela of Ankhenesneferibre - English translation

|-

God's Wives of Amun
Princesses of the Twenty-sixth Dynasty of Egypt
6th-century BC Egyptian women
6th-century BC clergy